University of California Television (known simply as UCTV) is a 24-hour television channel presenting educational and enrichment programming from the campuses, national laboratories, and affiliated institutions of the University of California system. UCTV's non-commercial programming delivers science, health and medicine, public affairs, humanities, and the arts to a general audience, as well as specialized programming for health care professionals and teachers. Programming includes documentaries, lectures, debates, interviews, performances and more.

UCTV is an Educational-access television cable TV channel. See "Where to watch" below. UCTV can also be seen worldwide via live webstream, video-on-demand archives (Flash files), and offers both audio and video podcasts for downloading. UCTV programs are also available on YouTube, Apple podcast, Roku and Amazon Fire. UCTV was available nationwide on Dish Network (channel 9412) (service terminated by Dish as of March 1, 2012).

UCTV launched in January 2000 on the Dish Network and is based on the UC San Diego campus where UCSD-TV is also located. UCTV collects programming from each of the ten University of California campuses (UC Berkeley, UC Davis, UC Irvine, UC Los Angeles, UC Merced, UC Riverside, UC San Diego, UC San Francisco, UC Santa Barbara, UC Santa Cruz) and affiliated institutions (Lawrence Berkeley National Laboratory, Lawrence Livermore National Laboratory, Los Alamos National Laboratory, UC Agriculture & Natural Resources, UC Office of the President, UC Sacramento Center, UC Washington DC Center).

Thematic programming

UCTV airs 25 hours of original programming per week on a rotating 24-hour schedule of three-hour thematic blocks in the areas of science, health and medicine, public affairs, humanities, and arts and music

UCTV offers a one-hour program block for health care professionals called The Med Ed Hour (Tuesday through Thursday at noon Pacific), featuring medical programs for physicians, nurses and other health care professionals.

University of California
Internet television channels